Tecoma stans is a species of flowering perennial shrub in the trumpet vine family, Bignoniaceae, that is native to the Americas.  Common names include yellow trumpetbush, yellow bells, yellow elder, ginger Thomas. Tecoma stans is the official flower of the United States Virgin Islands and the floral emblem of The Bahamas.

Description
Tecoma stans is a semi-evergreen shrub that can grow to a small tree 6 to 9 meters high. It features opposite odd-pinnate green leaves, with 3 to 13 serrate, 8- to 10-cm-long leaflets. The leaflets, glabrous on both sides, have a lanceolate blade 2–10 cm long and 1–4 cm wide, with a long acuminate apex and a wedge-shaped base.

The large, showy, golden yellow, trumpet-shaped flowers are in clusters at the ends of branches. The corolla of the flower is bell- to funnel-shaped, five-lobed (weakly two-lipped), often reddish-veined in the throat and is 3.5 to 8.5 cm long. Flowering takes place all year round. The fruits, narrow capsules, arise from two carpels and are up to 25 cm long. A fruit contains many yellow seeds with membranopus wings; when the fruit opens upon ripening, these seed are spread by the wind (anemochory). The flowers attract bees, butterflies, and hummingbirds. Apart from sexually by seed, Tecoma stans can also be reproduced asexually by stem cuttings.

Habitat
Tecoma stans is native to the Americas. It extends from the southern United States through Mexico, Central America, and the Antilles to northern Venezuela, and through the Andes mountain range to northern Argentina. It was introduced in southern Africa, India, and Hawaii.

Yellow trumpetbush is a ruderal species, readily colonizing disturbed, rocky, sandy, and cleared land and occasionally becoming an invasive weed. It thrives in a wide variety of ecosystems, from high altitude temperate forests and tropical deciduous and evergreen forests, to xerophilous scrub and the intertropical littoral. It quickly colonizes disturbed, rocky, sandy, and cleared fields. The species prefers dry and sunny regions of the coast.

Cultivation

Tecoma stans is drought-tolerant and grows well in warm climates. It is cultivated as an ornamental. They are grown in many parts of the world for their beautiful flowering, to adorn streets and gardens. It can be easily propagated by stem cuttings.

Uses
The wood of Tecoma stans is used in rustic architecture like bahareque, for the construction of furniture and canoes, or as firewood or charcoal. It is a medicinal plant used against diabetes and against diseases of the digestive system, among other uses. The plant is desirable fodder when it grows in fields grazed by livestock. 

It is a very potent anti-venom against cobra venom, used by Pakistani old medicine. It is proved to be better than antiserum, the paste of this plant's leaves are applied topically on the cobra bite. Its bio-chemicals bind with the cobra venom enzymes thus effectively inhibiting the venom.

Invasiveness
Tecoma stans has invasive potential and occasionally becomes a weed. The species is considered invasive in Africa (especially South Africa), South America, Asia, Australia and the Pacific Islands. It now presents a significant danger for biodiversity. It competes with local species and can form thick, almost monospecific thickets.

Gallery

References

External links

USDA Plants Profile
US Forest Service article (pdf)
FloriData
Tecoma stans as a weed

stans
National symbols of the Bahamas
Flora of North America
Flora of South America
Garden plants of Central America